Fort Pierce South is a census-designated place (CDP) in St. Lucie County, Florida, United States. The population was 5,062 at the 2010 census. It is part of the Port St. Lucie Metropolitan Statistical Area.

Geography
Fort Pierce South is located at  (27.415937, -80.352378).

Demographics

As of the census of 2000, there were 5,672 people, 2,053 households, and 1,478 families residing in the CDP. The racial makeup of the CDP was 77.29% White, 13.13% African American, 0.05% Native American, 1.16% Asian, 0.05% Pacific Islander, 5.73% from other races, and 2.57% from two or more races. Hispanic or Latino of any race were 17.60% of the population.

There were 2,053 households, out of which 35.7% had children under the age of 18 living with them, 51.0% were married couples living together, 14.9% had a female householder with no husband present, and 28.0% were non-families. 20.8% of all households were made up of individuals, and 7.8% had someone living alone who was 65 years of age or older.  The average household size was 2.76 and the average family size was 3.17.

In the CDP, the population was spread out, with 27.9% under the age of 18, 10.6% from 18 to 24, 29.0% from 25 to 44, 21.1% from 45 to 64, and 11.4% who were 65 years of age or older.  The median age was 33 years. For every 100 females, there were 96.3 males.  For every 100 females age 18 and over, there were 97.7 males.

The median income for a household in the CDP was $31,308, and the median income for a family was $35,383. Males had a median income of $26,830 versus $21,810 for females. The per capita income for the CDP was $16,801.  About 12.0% of families and 17.6% of the population were below the poverty line, including 26.1% of those under age 18 and 9.7% of those age 65 or over.

References

Census-designated places in St. Lucie County, Florida
Fort Pierce, Florida
Port St. Lucie metropolitan area
Census-designated places in Florida